Joe Slovo (born Yossel Mashel Slovo; 23 May 1926 – 6 January 1995) was a South African politician, and an opponent of the apartheid system. A Marxist-Leninist, he was a long-time leader and theorist in the South African Communist Party (SACP), a leading member of the African National Congress (ANC), and a commander of the ANC's military wing Umkhonto we Sizwe (MK).

A South African citizen from a Jewish-Lithuanian family, Slovo was a delegate to the multiracial Congress of the People of June 1955 which drew up the Freedom Charter. He was imprisoned for six months in 1960, and emerged as a leader of Umkhonto we Sizwe the following year. He lived in exile from 1963 to 1990, conducting operations against the apartheid régime from the United Kingdom, Angola, Mozambique, and Zambia. In 1990 he returned to South Africa, and took part in the negotiations that ended apartheid. He became known for proposing the "sunset clauses" covering the 5 years following a democratic election, including guarantees and concessions to all sides, and his fierce non-racialist stance. After the elections of 1994, he became Minister for Housing in Nelson Mandela's government. He died of cancer in 1995.

Life
Slovo was born in Obeliai, Lithuania, to a Jewish family that emigrated to the Union of South Africa when he was eight. His father worked as a truck driver in Johannesburg. Although his family were religious, he became an atheist who retained respect for "the positive aspects of Jewish culture". Slovo was educated at King Edward VII School and left school in 1941 and found work as a dispatch clerk. He joined the National Union of Distributive Workers and, as a shop steward, was involved in organising a strike.

Slovo joined the South African Communist Party in 1942. Inspired by the Red Army's battles against the Nazis on the Eastern Front of World War II, Slovo volunteered to fight in the war. He served as a Signaler in combat operations for the South African forces in North Africa and Italy, and on his return to South Africa he joined the Springbok Legion, a multiracial radical ex-servicemen's organization.

Between 1946 and 1950 he completed a law degree at Wits University and was a student activist. He was in the same class as Nelson Mandela and Harry Schwarz. In 1949 he married Ruth First, another prominent Jewish anti-apartheid activist and the daughter of SACP treasurer Julius First. They had three daughters, Shawn, Gillian and Robyn. Ruth First was assassinated in 1982 in Maputo, by order of Craig Williamson, a major in the South African Police.

In 1950, the SACP was banned and both First and Slovo were listed as communists under the Suppression of Communism Act and could not be quoted or attend public gatherings in South Africa. He became active in the South African Congress of Democrats (an ally of the ANC as part of the Congress Alliance) and was a delegate to the June 1955 Congress of the People organised by the ANC and Indian, Coloured and white organisations at Kliptown near Johannesburg, that drew up the Freedom Charter. He was arrested and detained for two months during the Treason Trial of 1956. Charges against him were dropped in 1958. He was later arrested for six months during the State of Emergency declared after the Sharpeville massacre in 1960.

In 1961, Slovo and Abongz Mbede emerged as two of the leaders of Umkhonto we Sizwe (MK), the military wing of the ANC, formed in alliance between the ANC and the SACP. In 1963 he went into exile and lived in Britain, Angola, Mozambique and Zambia. In his capacity as chief of staff of MK he codetermined its activities, like the 1983 Church Street bombing. In 1982, Slovo's wife, Ruth First was assassinated in Maputo, Mozambique, where the couple lived in exile. In 1984, Slovo, an ANC and SACP member, was forced to leave Mozambique in terms of the Nkomati Accord between the Marxist People's Republic of Mozambique and apartheid South Africa. In 1984, he was elected general secretary of the SACP in Lusaka, Zambia, and in 1985, he became the first white member of the ANC's national executive.

Slovo was a leading theoretician in both the SACP and the ANC. In the 1970s he wrote the influential essay "South Africa: No Middle Road", which argued that the apartheid government would be unable to achieve stability, co-opt significant sections of the small but growing black middle class, or democratise: the only choice was between an insurrectionary overthrow of apartheid, centred on MK, or ever greater repression.

At the time the SACP's orthodox pro-Soviet and two-stage view of change in South Africa - "national democratic revolution" first, socialism later - was dominant in the ANC-led liberation movement. Slovo's 1988 "The South African Working Class and the National Democratic Revolution" defended the two-stage conception, insisting that "national democratic revolution" would "implement economic measures which go far beyond bourgeois-democracy" and so "erect a favourable framework for a socialist transformation but will not, in themselves, create, or necessarily lead to, socialism".

In 1989, he wrote "Has Socialism Failed?" which acknowledged the weaknesses of the socialist movement and the excesses of Stalinism, while at the same time rejecting attempts by the left to distance themselves from socialism. Slovo insisted on having a "justified confidence in the future of socialism and its inherent moral superiority", and pointing to "the failures of capitalism", although he now rejected the one-party state model.

In 1990, he returned to the country to participate in the early "talks about talks" between the government and the ANC. Ailing, he stood down as SACP general secretary in 1991 and was given the titular position of SACP chairperson. Slovo was succeeded by Chris Hani, who was assassinated two years later by a white right-winger. Slovo was a long-demonised figure in white South African society, widely misrepresented as a KGB colonel or Russian secret agent, and attracted a great deal of press after his return.

In 1992, Slovo secured a major breakthrough in the negotiations to end apartheid in South Africa by presenting the "sunset clauses" developed by the ANC/ SACP leadership: a coalition government for five years following democratic elections, guarantees for civil servants, including the homelands and armed forces, and an amnesty process. These were intended to head off right-wing coups and destabilisation. However, Slovo specifically rejected any compromise on full majority rule, and any agreement that "constitutionally prevented permanently" a new government "from effectively intervening to advance the process of redressing the racially accumulated imbalances in all spheres of life".

After the elections of 1994, Slovo became Minister for housing in Nelson Mandela's government, until his death in 1995 of cancer.  His funeral was attended by the entire high command of the ANC, and by most of the highest officials in the country, including both Nelson Mandela and Thabo Mbeki, and he was buried in Avalon Cemetery, Soweto, unheard of, for a white South African. 50,000 people, virtually all black, attended the event.

Civic and similar tributes
In 2004 Slovo was voted 47th in the Top 100 Great South Africans. Shack settlements built on land occupations in both Durban and Cape Town were named after Joe Slovo by their founders. Harrow Road in Johannesburg and Field Street in Durban Central were renamed Joe Slovo Drive and Joe Slovo Street respectively. A newly constructed Residence building at Rhodes University in Grahamstown, South Africa, has been named "Joe Slovo" in honour of the man. The Congress of South African Trade Unions, the largest union federation in South Africa, and an ally of the ANC and SACP, helps organise the annual Joe Slovo Memorial Lecture and normally issues a statement on the anniversary of his death. Slovo was widely admired across southern Africa, leading Zimbabwean magazine, Southern African Political and Economic Monthly running a special issue on his death, and describing Slovo in an obituary as a "liberation war hero" and "African patriot" completely immersed in the struggle for black freedom.

Cinema and music
Joe Slovo appears as a character in two films for which Shawn Slovo wrote the screenplay. In the award-winning 1988 movie A World Apart, he is depicted as "Gus Roth" (played by Jeroen Krabbé). He is played by Malcolm Purkey in the 2006 film Catch A Fire.

References

External links
Joe Slovo – biographical sketch at the homepage of the ANC
Joe Slovo Archive at marxists.org
"Speeches and Writings of Joe Slovo", hosted by the SACP
"Old Marxist Returns, With Hope for South Africa" – article by Chris Hedges, The New York Times, 17 October 1990
"Joe Slovo: Ode to a mensch" – eulogy by friend Linzi Manicom
Has Socialism Failed? https://www.marxists.org/subject/africa/slovo/1989/socialism-failed.htm*

1926 births
1995 deaths
Jewish South African anti-apartheid activists
People from Obeliai
Lithuanian Jews
South African Jews
South African Communist Party politicians
African National Congress politicians
South African communists
Deaths from cancer in South Africa
Jewish South African politicians
Jewish atheists
Jewish socialists
Lithuanian emigrants to South Africa
Marxist writers
Joe
South African activists
South African military personnel of World War II
South African people of Lithuanian-Jewish descent
South African revolutionaries
South African socialists
University of the Witwatersrand alumni
People acquitted of treason
South African atheists
White South African anti-apartheid activists
South African prisoners and detainees
Prisoners and detainees of South Africa
UMkhonto we Sizwe personnel